Bathanatos was a Celtic king in Thrace who ruled the Scordisci.

References

Celtic rulers
Ancient Thrace